The canton of Murat is an administrative division of the Cantal department, southern France. Its borders were modified at the French canton reorganisation which came into effect in March 2015. Its seat is in Murat.

It consists of the following communes:
 
Albepierre-Bredons
Allanche
La Chapelle-d'Alagnon
Charmensac
Cheylade
Le Claux
Dienne
Joursac
Landeyrat
Laveissenet
Laveissière
Lavigerie
Murat
Neussargues en Pinatelle
Peyrusse
Pradiers
Saint-Saturnin
Ségur-les-Villas
Ussel
Vernols
Vèze
Virargues

References

Cantons of Cantal